Adrian Ioan Gongolea (born 20 August 1975) is a Romanian former professional footballer who played as a midfielder.

References

External links
 
 

1975 births
Living people
People from Ocna Mureș
Romanian footballers
Association football defenders
Liga I players
Liga II players
Regionalliga players
CSM Deva players
FC Bihor Oradea players
FC Brașov (1936) players
FC Rapid București players
FC Olimpia Satu Mare players
Borussia Fulda players
FC Augsburg players
Bonner SC players
Nyíregyháza Spartacus FC players
ASA 2013 Târgu Mureș players
Romanian expatriate footballers
Expatriate footballers in Germany
Romanian expatriate sportspeople in Germany
Expatriate footballers in Hungary
Romanian expatriate sportspeople in Hungary